North River Mills is a historic unincorporated community in Hampshire County in the U.S. state of West Virginia. North River Mills is located between Capon Bridge and Slanesville on Cold Stream Road (County Routes 15 and 45/20) at its intersection with North River Road (County Route 4/2). The village of North River Mills lies along the eastern banks of North River from which it takes its name.

Historic sites 
 Audra Croston Home
 Hiett Log House
 Kump House (early 19th Century)
 North River Mills United Methodist Church
 The North River Mills Historic District was listed on the National Register of Historic Places in 2011.

See also 
 Ice Mountain
 North River

References

External links

 The Nature Conservancy's Ice Mountain Preserve website
 The North River Mills Society for Antiquarian Arts and the Diffusion of Knowledge

Unincorporated communities in Hampshire County, West Virginia
Unincorporated communities in West Virginia